Stephen Johns is a British  classical music producer. He is currently the Artistic Director at the Royal College of Music in London, England.

Johns has won numerous awards, including four Grammy Awards.

References

Year of birth missing (living people)
Living people
British record producers
English record producers